Allium decipiens is a Eurasian species of garlic in the amaryllis family native to eastern Europe and western Asia.

Allium decipiens has a spherical bulb. Scape is up to 100 cm tall. Leaves are flat, linear-lanceolate. Umbel is hemispherical with many flowers crowded together. Tepals are whitish with a dark green midvein. Ovary green.

subspecies
 Allium decipiens subsp. decipiens - Ukraine, European Russia, Western Siberia, Altay Krai, Caucasus, Turkey
 Allium decipiens subsp. quercetorum Seregin - Crimea, northwestern Caucasus

References

decipiens
Garlic
Flora of Eastern Europe
Flora of temperate Asia
Plants described in 1830